The Elton John AIDS Foundation Academy Award Party is one of the annual parties held in Los Angeles following the Academy Awards ceremony the same evening. The first party was held in February 1993 at Maple Drive Restaurant and raised $300,000. It had been produced by Patrick Lippert, an AIDS activist who died of the disease just months later. In recent years it has been held at the Pacific Design Center and was attended by 650 people in 2009. It is hosted by Elton John and the AIDS Foundation, and is one of the most high-profile parties in the Hollywood film industry, particularly for people of British origin working in Hollywood films or the entertainment industry. The annual party contributes to the foundation fund by its high priced ticket sales which are given by invitation only ($3500 or £2400 as of 2009) and a celebrity auction. The 2010 party raised over $8 million or £4 million.

Elton John has been quoted as saying that the 98% of the proceeds of the party go to the foundation.

This party became a point of contention between two Real Housewives of Beverly Hills stars Sutton Stracke and Lisa Rinna when it was revealed that Sutton Stracke provided her with a ticket when she bought a table and never received a thank you.

Venues
1993 65th Academy Awards: Maple Drive Restaurant
1994 66th Academy Awards: 
1995 67th Academy Awards: Four Seasons Hotel, Beverly Hills
1996 68th Academy Awards: 
1997 69th Academy Awards: 
1998 70th Academy Awards: Spago restaurant, Beverly Hills
1999 71st Academy Awards: Pagani
2000 72nd Academy Awards: 
2001 73rd Academy Awards: Moomba restaurant, West Hollywood
2002 74th Academy Awards: Moomba restaurant, West Hollywood
2003 75th Academy Awards: 
2004 76th Academy Awards:  
2005 77th Academy Awards: Pacific Design Center, West Hollywood
2006 78th Academy Awards: Pacific Design Center, West Hollywood
2007 79th Academy Awards: Pacific Design Center, West Hollywood
2008 80th Academy Awards: Pacific Design Center, West Hollywood
2009 81st Academy Awards: Pacific Design Center, West Hollywood
2010 82nd Academy Awards: Pacific Design Center, West Hollywood
2011 83rd Academy Awards: Pacific Design Center, West Hollywood
2012 84th Academy Awards: West Hollywood Park, West Hollywood
2013 85th Academy Awards: Pacific Design Center, West Hollywood
2014 86th Academy Awards: West Hollywood Park, West Hollywood
2015 87th Academy Awards: West Hollywood Park, West Hollywood
2016 88th Academy Awards: West Hollywood Park, West Hollywood
2017 89th Academy Awards: West Hollywood Park, West Hollywood
2018 90th Academy Awards: West Hollywood Park, West Hollywood
2019 91st Academy Awards: West Hollywood Park, West Hollywood
2020 92nd Academy Awards: West Hollywood Park, West Hollywood
2021 93rd Academy Awards: Worldwide

References

External links
Official site

1993 establishments in California
Academy Awards
Elton John
Culture of Hollywood, Los Angeles
Parties
Annual events in California